Roberto Santamaría Calavia (born 12 March 1962), known simply as Roberto, is a Spanish retired footballer who played as a goalkeeper.

Club career
Born in Pamplona, Navarre, Roberto spent 12 professional years at local CA Osasuna, being the team's undisputed starter in eight of those. In the 1986–87 season he contributed 19 games, but the side barely avoided La Liga relegation.

In the 1990–91 campaign, as Osasuna finished a best-ever fourth place in the top division, Roberto played 3,191 minutes in 36 matches. Two years later he did not concede one single goal for 488 minutes, which stood in the club's record books for more than 20 years.

However, the emergence of 19-year-old Javier López Vallejo, also groomed at Osasuna, prompted his exit in 1995 at the age of 33 to Segunda División B side Málaga CF, and he closed out his career after two more seasons. He then returned to his first club, acting as goalkeeper coach for both the first and second teams.

Personal life
Roberto's nephew, Roberto Santamaría Ciprián, was also a footballer and a goalkeeper. He too represented Osasuna and Málaga.

References

External links

1962 births
Living people
Spanish footballers
Footballers from Pamplona
Association football goalkeepers
La Liga players
Segunda División players
Segunda División B players
CA Osasuna B players
CA Osasuna players
UE Lleida players
Málaga CF players